Mahanabad (also Romanized as Mahānābād; also known as Mahān, Moḩammadabābād, and Moḩammadābād) is a village in Sarab Rural District, Giyan District, Nahavand County, Hamadan Province, Iran. At the 2006 census, its population was 418, in 104 families.

References 

Populated places in Nahavand County